Ben Mor Coigach is the highest point along a ridge rising steeply from Loch Broom, in the far north-west of Scotland. It rises above the Coigach peninsula, in the county of Ross and Cromarty, 10 kilometres north-west of Ullapool, reaching a height of 743 metres (2438 feet). Its coastal position, combined with its high topographic prominence to height ratio, provides a spectacular panorama, sweeping from Ullapool across to the Summer Isles and north over the Coigach to the distinctive peaks of the Assynt, as well as more distant views to Skye and the Outer Hebrides, conditions permitting.
The area is a Scottish Wildlife Trust nature reserve.

Ascents 
Ben Mor Coigach can be climbed from Bleughasary (where there is a car park) to the south-east, or from Culnacraig to the south-west.

From Bleughasary, follow a 4x4 track (shown on the OS map) as far as Loch Eadar dha Bheinn, then pass the outflow east of the loch and head up onto the east ridge. From here the route passes over the Speicin Coinnich and onto a large and flat summit area. The Speicin Coinnich is quite exposed but not as steep as it may appear from below.

A more popular starting point, albeit requiring a longer drive in via Achiltibuie, is from Culnacraig. One option follows the line of a long ridge towards the summit of Sgurr an Fhidhleir (the Fiddler). This can either be included or traversed via its south face, before the ascent of Ben Mor Coigach from the north-east. 
A more direct but at times steeper route rises east from Culnacraig in just two kilometres to the ridge's southwestern peak of Speicein nan Garbh Choireachan (738 metres). From here follow the impressive and exposed crest of the ridge, drop down to a col and rise up northward to the summit, before dropping to the next saddle and turning west along the spur between the two deep burns (Allt) running back to Culnacraig.

The Postman's Path 

Some walkers may be tempted to use one of the above-mentioned starting points, then descend via the other before completing the loop via part of the "Postman's Path" which follows the coast from Culnacraig to Strathcanaird. Named after the postmen who used it before the hamlets of the Coigach were connected to the road network, the path links Culnacraig with Bulghassary over about seven miles. Warnings at signposts at each end should not be dismissed. Even a fit walker may struggle to complete this leg in less than four hours. At times the extremely narrow path traverses 45-degree slopes which drop straight into Loch Broom. Easy scrambling is required in places, and some of these moves can feel exposed. Burn crossings may be difficult or even impossible in spate, in high summer vegetation may obscure the path and at the Strathcanaird end, bogs add to the difficulties. Despite its low altitude, this route traverses steep, exposed slopes, and should be regarded as a true mountain walk. 
In 2021 the Coigach & Assynt Living Landscape announced that an upgrade to the path had been completed. Apart from a short section of slab paving and a few additional marker posts, as of June 2021 the exposed sections of the track appear to be unchanged.

References 

 The Corbetts and Other Scottish Hills, (SMC Guide) 
 Walk in Scotland
 Geograph
 Illustrated trip report
 Scottish Coastal Walk

External links
Walk Highlands entry, including pronunciation

Coigach & Assynt Postman's Path upgrade.

Marilyns of Scotland
Mountains and hills of the Northwest Highlands
Nature reserves in Scotland
Ross and Cromarty
Grahams